Horst Hirnschrodt (5 December 1940 – 24 May 2018) was an Austrian footballer who played for Austria Wien, Austria Salzburg and the Austria national team, as a defender.

References

1940 births
2018 deaths
Austrian footballers
Austria international footballers
FK Austria Wien players
FC Red Bull Salzburg players
Austrian Football Bundesliga players
Association football defenders
Footballers from Vienna